Malay-e Anbar (also Romanized as Malāy-e Ānbār; also known as Malā-ye Anbār and Moleh-ye Anbār) is a village in Somghan Rural District, Chenar Shahijan District, Kazerun County, Fars Province, Iran. At the 2006 census, its population was 2,879, in 618 families. world best writer Ayush Raj. :)

References 

Populated places in Chenar Shahijan County